Unibail-Rodamco-Westfield SE (previously Unibail-Rodamco SE) is a European multinational commercial real estate company headquartered in Paris, France. Its history originates with the formation of two separate shopping centre operators, Unibail (founded in France in 1968) and Rodamco Europe (founded in the Netherlands in 1999), which merged in 2007 and became a societas Europaea in 2009. The company acquired Australian shopping centre operator Westfield Corporation in June 2018.

As of 2018, Unibail-Rodamco-Westfield is the largest commercial real estate company in Europe, and is a component of the Euro Stoxx 50 stock market index, as well as the French CAC40. Its portfolio consists of retail property, office buildings, and convention centers within Europe and North America. Many of its shopping centres use the Westfield brand launched by Westfield Group in 1960 and shared with Scentre Group for properties in Australia and New Zealand since 2014. Retail properties owned by Unibail-Rodamco before the merger carry the Westfield name. As of July 2022, the group owned 87 shopping centres.

History

Background
Unibail was founded in 1968 as a finance-leasing unit by a company called Worms & Cie. In 1991, Unibail started focusing on the property investment sector, and phased out involvement in lease financing. It built a property portfolio of close to 30 shopping centres across France – including the Forum des Halles and the arcade within CNIT – and substantial office properties in Paris and La Défense – including the Tour Ariane and the Paris Expo group of convention centres. Rodamco Europe formed in 1999 when Rodamco, a property investment fund set up by the Dutch asset management group Robeco in 1979, broke up into various independent listed companies covering different parts of the world. Rodamco Europe subsequently collected a portfolio primarily consisting of shopping centres and other retail spaces across 14 European countries, along with some office property in France and the Netherlands, acquiring smaller European rivals in the process.

2007–2017: Unibail-Rodamco

On April 10, 2007, Rodamco Europe announced an agreement to conduct a merger of equals with Unibail to create the largest publicly traded property company in Europe. The merger was confirmed on June 21, 2007, after Unibail announced the acquisition of 80% of Rodamco's shares, making its offer for the remainder unconditional. The merged entity took effect as a société anonyme under the new name Unibail-Rodamco on June 25, 2007.

On June 1, 2011, Unibail-Rodamco hired former FNAC CEO Christophe Cuvillier as the new COO. In collaboration with CEO and Chairman of the Board Guillaume Poitrinal, he led the company to five years of growth in spite of tough economic conditions.

In May 2015, Unibail revealed it had signed an agreement with the Canada Pension Plan Investment Board to sell its 46.1% stake in German shopping mall operator MFI AG for €394 million.

2018–present: Acquisition of Westfield

In December 2017, Unibail took over Westfield Corporation, which operated 35 shopping centres in the US and the UK, for a reported price of 24.8 billion. The Australian shopping centres branded as Westfield and held by Scentre were not acquired by Unibail. The deal was completed in June 2018, and the shopping centres owned by Unibail-Rodamco before the merger had their names modified to have the Westfield brand, with 10 flagships starting in September 2019.

In November 2020, Colin Dyer resigned as supervisory-board chairman after a shareholder meeting rejected the board's proposal to raise 3.5 billion euros ($4.15 billion). Dyer remained on the board but was replaced as chairman by former Unibail CEO Leon Bressler, one of a consortium of shareholders and investors who had opposed the capital increase and other proposed strategies. In January 2021, Jean-Marie Tritant was appointed Chairman of the Management Board and Chief Executive Officer of the group.

In April 2022, the company announced a plan to sell all of its U.S. malls—24 of them—within two years.

Corporate affairs

Management
 Jean-Marie Tritant – Group Chief Executive Officer
 Fabrice Mouchel – Group Chief Financial Officer
 Astrid Panosyan – Group Chief Resources Officer
 Olivier Bossard – Group Chief Development Officer
 Domenic Lowe – Chief operating officer U.S.
 Michel Dessolain – Chief Operating Officer (Europe)
 Peter Miller – Chief Operating Officer (UK, Italy, Benelux)
 Gerard Sieben – Chief Financial Officer (WFD Unibail-Rodamco N.V.)

Shareholders
The following are the company shareholders as of December 2021:

 Xavier Niel (Rock Investment et NJJ Market) - 23.2%
 APG Asset Management NV - 4.61%
 Norges Bank Investment Management - 4.43%
 Aermont Capital LLP - 3.05%
 The Vanguard Group, Inc. - 2.90%
 BlackRock Advisors (UK) Ltd. - 2.21%
 BlackRock Fund Advisors - 1.82%
 Amundi Asset Management SA - 1.11%
AXA Investment Managers (Paris) SA - 1.00%
Dimensional Fund Advisors LP - 0.84%

Indexes
Unibail-Rodamco-Westfield is listed in several indexes, including:
 FTSE4Good (since 2008)
 Dow Jones Sustainability Index (World since 2008 and Europe since 2010)
 Advanced Sustainability Performance Eurozone Index (since 2010)
 Ethibel Sustainability Index (since 2011)
 ECPI Index (since 2011)
 STOXX Global ESG Leaders Index (since 2011)
 Standard Ethics French Index (since 2015)

Unibail-Rodamco-Westfield is rated A by Standard & Poor’s and Fitch Ratings.

In 2015, Standard Ethics Aei has given a rating to Unibail-Rodamco-Westfield in order to include it in its Standard Ethics French Index.

Assets

Unibail-Rodamco-Westfield owns 87 shopping centers (as of April 2021) in the main cities of the countries where it operates, 97% of which attract more than 6 million visitors per year. In terms of Office Real Estate, Unibail-Rodamco invests in and develops efficient buildings with more than 10,000 square metres of usable retail space in Paris, such as the Ariane Tower in La Défense and the Majunga Tower.

To conceive and design its buildings, Unibail-Rodamco-Westfield works with high-end architectural firms like Thomas Mayne of Morphosis firm, Herzog & de Meuron, RIADH group (De La Hoz, Cottrell, Michelangeli), the firm Architecture Farshid Moussavi, Cuno & Jean Brullmann Crochon-Luc, Jean-Paul Viguier, Epstein & Glaiman / Recevki Architecture, Araldo Cossutta & Ponte, and Arte-Charpentier.

References

External links

 
 

Companies based in Paris
Companies listed on Euronext Amsterdam
Companies listed on the Australian Securities Exchange
French companies established in 2007
Real estate companies established in 2007
Real estate companies of France
Real estate companies of the Netherlands
Shopping center management firms
CAC 40